The GM L3B engine is a turbocharged four-cylinder gasoline engine designed by General Motors. Production takes place at GM's Spring Hill Manufacturing.

In addition to GM's active fuel management, start-stop system, and variable valve timing, which are already featured on GM's other full-size pickup truck engines, this engine also features GM's Intake Valve Lift Control which has 3 different intake cam profiles that are electromagnetically actuated to provide the best fuel economy and performance at a wider range of operating conditions.
 
The engine is the first GM truck engine to feature an active thermal management system. This system consists of an electrically driven water pump and a 3-way rotary valve which allows the engine to maintain proper operating temperatures and quicker warm-ups. Also, a continuously variable oil pump helps to lower parasitic losses as well as providing proper lubrication and cooling to the engine, especially under high-load conditions.

Instead of two side-by-side exhaust passages like on a regular twin-scroll turbocharger, in this design the two exhaust passages are concentric and allow for better use of the exhaust pulse energy.

History
With the unveiling of the 2022 model year Silverado, GM announced a significant revision that stiffened and strengthened the engine allowing for a GM-estimated increased maximum torque rating of  while also improving noise, vibration, and harshness (NVH).

Applications

References

General Motors engines
Straight-four engines
Gasoline engines by model